The 2015–16 Hofstra Pride men's basketball team represents Hofstra University during the 2015–16 NCAA Division I men's basketball season. The Pride, led by third year head coach Joe Mihalich, play their home games at Mack Sports Complex and were members of the Colonial Athletic Association. They finished the season 24–10, 14–4 in CAA play to finish in a tie for the CAA championship with UNC Wilmington. They advanced to the championship game of the CAA tournament where they lost to UNC Wilmington. As a regular season champion who failed to win their league tournament, they received an automatic bid to the National Invitation Tournament where they lost in the first round to George Washington.

Previous season
The Pride finished the season 20–14, 10–8 in CAA play to finish in fifth place. They advanced to the semifinals of the CAA tournament where they lost to William & Mary. They were invited to the College Basketball Invitational where they lost in the first round to Vermont.

Departures

Incoming transfers

2015 recruiting class

Roster

Schedule

|-
!colspan=12 style="background:#16007C; color:#FFAD00;"| Non-conference regular season
|-

|-
!colspan=12 style="background:#16007C; color:#FFAD00;"| CAA regular season

|-
!colspan=12 style="background:#16007C; color:#FFAD00;"| CAA tournament

|-
!colspan=12 style="background:#16007C; color:#FFAD00;"| NIT

See also
2015–16 Hofstra Pride women's basketball team

References

Hofstra Pride men's basketball seasons
Hofstra
Hofstra